Jane Elizabeth Marie Lapotaire (née Burgess; 26 December 1944) is an English actress.

Biography
Lapotaire was born in Ipswich, Suffolk, the daughter of Louise Elise (Burgess). Her stepfather, Yves Lapotaire, worked in the oil industry and was originally from Quebec, Canada. From the age of two months, she was raised as a foster child by an old-age pensioner, Grace Chisnell (Granny Grace), who was also the foster mother of Lapotaire's own biological mother, a French orphan, who was abandoned in England. When Lapotaire was about 12, her biological mother made a bid to get her back. The child welfare department of the Suffolk County Council intervened and decided that the mother had this right. Lapotaire chose to be with Granny Grace, but lived with her biological mother and stepfather, who worked in various French oil companies in North Africa (particularly Libya), three times a year. She also adopted their family name. The Lapotaires in North Africa were Francophones, and like French colonials at that time, lived around the French embassy. Granny Grace died in 1984 aged 96 and Louise Burgess died in 1999.

She studied at the Bristol Old Vic Theatre School from 1961 to 1963, the programme was a two-year course at that time, unlike the three-year course today. She had earlier auditioned for the Royal Academy of Dramatic Art  in London ,but failed to get in. She joined the Bristol Old Vic theatre company in 1965. She joined the National Theatre in 1967, was a founding member of The Young Vic Theatre in 1970/1971, and moved to the Royal Shakespeare Company in 1974.

Her performance in the title role of Marie Curie (1977) first brought her to wide attention. In 1978, she performed the title role Édith Piaf for Pam Gems's play Piaf, directed by Howard Davies for the Royal Shakespeare Company, in Stratford-upon-Avon and in London at the Warehouse Theatre, Covent Garden in 1979. Two years later, the show moved to Broadway. Lapotaire won the Tony Award for Best Actress in a Play that year.

She was married to director Roland Joffé from 1974 to 1980; they had one son, screenwriter and director Rowan Joffé (born 1973). Following their divorce, she was for a time the partner of actor Michael Pennington.

She returned to the Royal Shakespeare Company in October–November 2013 as the Duchess of Gloucester in Gregory Doran's adaptation of Richard II with David Tennant in the title role. This was followed in October–December 2015 as Queen Isobel in Henry V. On Christmas Day in 2014, she appeared as Princess Irina Kuragin in season five, episode nine of Downton Abbey.

Writing
Lapotaire has written a number of memoirs: Grace and Favour, Out of Order: A Haphazard Journey Through One Woman's Year, and Everybody's Daughter, Nobody's Child, which includes an account of her childhood growing up in Levington Road, Ipswich.

Illness
On 11 January 2000, while preparing to teach a course on Shakespeare at the Ecole Internationale in Paris France, Lapotaire suffered a massive cerebral haemorrhage. Four days after her collapse, she underwent a six-hour surgery and spent the next three weeks largely unconscious. She writes about her recovery in Time Out of Mind.

Associations
Lapotaire is honorary president of the Bristol Old Vic Theatre Club, and is president of the Friends of Shakespeare's Globe.

Selected filmography

Theatre work
Her stage credits include:
 (Stage debut) Ruby Birtle, When We Are Married, Bristol Old Vic Theatre, Bristol, England, 1965
 Vivie, Mrs. Warren's Profession, Bristol Old Vic Theatre, 1965–1967
 Natasha, War and Peace, Bristol Old Vic Theatre, 1965–1967
 Ruth, The Homecoming, Bristol Old Vic Theatre, 1965–1967
 Judith, The Dance of Death, National Theatre, London, 1967
 Antoinette, A Flea in Her Ear, National Theatre, 1967
 Mincing, later Mrs. Fainall, The Way of the World, National Theatre, 1969
 Tania, Macrune's Guevara, National Theatre, 1969
 Zanche, The White Devil, National Theatre, 1969
 Don Quixote's niece, The Travails of Sancho Panza, National Theatre, 1969
 Jessica, The Merchant of Venice, National Theatre, 1970
 Zerbinetta, Scapino, Young Vic Theatre, London, 1970–1971
 Katherina, The Taming of the Shrew, Young Vic Theatre, 1970–1971
 Jocasta, Oedipus, Young Vic Theatre, 1970–1971
 Isabella, Measure for Measure, Young Vic Theatre, 1970–1971
 Lieschen, The Captain of Koepenick, National Theatre, 1971
 Lady Macduff, Macbeth, Royal Shakespeare Company, 1974
 Sonya, Uncle Vanya, Royal Shakespeare Company, 1974
 Rosalind, As You Like It, Nottingham Playhouse, Nottingham, England, then Edinburgh Festival, Edinburgh, Scotland, 1975
 Viola, Twelfth Night, Royal Shakespeare Company, Stratford, England, then Aldwych Theatre, London, 1975
 Vera, A Month in the Country, Royal Shakespeare Company, Albery Theatre, London, 1975
 Lucy Honeychurch, A Room with a View, Royal Shakespeare Company, Albery Theatre, 1975
 Rosalind, As You Like It, Riverside Studios, London, 1976
 Title role, The Duchess of Malfi, Bristol Old Vic Theatre, 1976
 Rosaline, Love's Labour's Lost, Stratford, 1978 then Aldwych Theatre, 1979
 Edith Piaf, Piaf, Other Place Theatre, London, then Warehouse Theatre, London, later Aldwych Theatre, all 1979 then Wyndham's Theatre and Piccadilly Theatre, both London, 1980 later Plymouth Theatre, New York City, 1981
 Eileen, Kick for Touch, National Theatre, 1983
 Belvidera, Venice Preserv'd, National Theatre, 1984
 Antigone, National Theatre, 1984
 Title role, Saint Joan, Compass Company, 1985
 Double Double, Fortune Theatre, London, 1986
 Misalliance, Royal Shakespeare Company, 1986
 Archbishop's Ceiling, Royal Shakespeare Company, 1986
 Greenland, Royal Court Theatre, London, 1988
 Joy Davidman, Shadowlands, Queen's Theatre, London, 1989-1990
 Gertrude, Hamlet, Royal Shakespeare Company, Barbican Theatre, London, 1992
 Mrs. Alving, Ghosts, Royal Shakespeare Company, Other Place Theatre, Stratford, 1993
 Katherine of Aragon, Henry VIII (also known as The Famous History of the Life of Henry VIII), Royal Shakespeare Company, Young Vic Theatre, 1998
 Major Tours
 Katherine of Aragon, Henry VIII (also known as The Famous History of the Life of Henry VIII), Royal Shakespeare Company, U.S. cities, 1998
 Maria Callas, Master Class, British cities, 1999

Awards
In April 2018, Lapotaire became the 29th recipient of the prestigious Pragnell Shakespeare Birthday Award and gave the 454th Shakespeare Birthday Lecture on 20 April 2018.

|-
! scope="row" | 1989
| Blind Justice (1988)
| British Academy Television Award for Best Actress
| 
|-
! scope="row" | 1978
| Marie Curie (1977)
| British Academy Television Award for Best Actress
| 

|-
! scope="row" | 1981
| Piaf (1978-1981)
| Tony Award for Best Actress in a Play
| 
|-
! scope="row" | 1983
| Piaf (1978-1981)
| CableACE Award for Actress in a Theatrical or Non-Musical Program
| 

|-
! scope="row" | 2020
| The Crown (2019)
| Gold Derby TV Award for Drama Guest Actress
|

References

External links
 
 
 

1944 births
20th-century British actresses
21st-century British actresses
Alumni of Bristol Old Vic Theatre School
British stage actresses
British film actresses
British television actresses
Living people
People educated at Northgate Grammar School, Ipswich
Actors from Ipswich
Tony Award winners
British memoirists
Laurence Olivier Award winners